The Division of Dunkley is an Australian electoral division in the state of Victoria. The division is located south-east of Melbourne in the Mornington Peninsula.

Geography
Since 1984, federal electoral division boundaries in Australia have been determined at redistributions by a redistribution committee appointed by the Australian Electoral Commission. Redistributions occur for the boundaries of divisions in a particular state, and they occur every seven years, or sooner if a state's representation entitlement changes or when divisions of a state are malapportioned.

History
The division was created in 1984 and is named for Louisa Margaret Dunkley, a trade unionist and campaigner for equal pay for women.

It was held by the Liberal Party from 1996 to 2019, however a 2018 boundary redistribution that favoured Labor, along with Labor’s increased statewide strength in Victoria resulted in Peta Murphy winning the seat for the Labor Party at the 2019 Australian federal election.

Members

Election results

References

External links
 Division of Dunkley - Australian Electoral Commission

Electoral divisions of Australia
Constituencies established in 1984
1984 establishments in Australia
City of Frankston
Mornington Peninsula
Frankston, Victoria
Electoral districts and divisions of Greater Melbourne